The Magicians Association of Korea (variously also translated as the DPRK Magicians Association or the Korea Magic Association of DPRK) is the national magicians' association of North Korea.

History 

Though Kim Jong-il had made efforts to develop magic on a Juche basis in 1971, it was not until 2001 that a dedicated nationwide magicians' society was established. The Magicians Association of Korea was founded on 24 October of that year, with headquarters in Pyongyang and ten branches across Korea.  Its goal is to contribute to the development of performance magic in the DPRK, and to foster cooperation with magicians and magicians' organizations abroad.

In 2002, the association was making arrangements to join the International Jugglers' Association, and it was admitted to the Fédération Internationale des Sociétés Magiques in 2012.

Activities 

The association has developed magic acts for performance in the DPRK and abroad. These have included Kim Chol's series of large-scale performances at Pyongyang's May Day Stadium in April 2011, and a touring performance in China in August 2011.

Notable members 

 Kim Thaek-song (chairman, 2001–)
 Kim Chol (vice-chairman)

References 

Magic organizations
Arts organizations established in 2001
2001 establishments in North Korea
Performing arts in North Korea
Organizations based in North Korea